Hồ Sỹ Giáp (born 18 April 1994) is a  Vietnamese footballer who plays as a forward for Becamex Bình Dương.

Honours
Becamex Bình Dương
Vietnamese National Cup: 2018; Runner-up 2017
Vietnamese Super Cup: Runner-up 2019

Individual
V.League 2 top scorer: 2016

References

External links

Living people
Vietnamese footballers
Association football forwards
V.League 1 players
Becamex Binh Duong FC players
1994 births